Gorgier Castle (also known as the Château de Gorgier) is a castle in the municipality of Gorgier of the Canton of Neuchâtel in Switzerland.  It is a Swiss heritage site of national significance.

History

The castle is located close to the city of Neuchâtel and was built around 1620.

In 1813, James-Alexandre de Pourtalès acquired the seigneury of Gorgier.

After being fully restored as a family home between 2004 and 2014, the castle was for sale by Sotheby's Realty around August 2014, but is no longer listed.

See also
 List of castles in Switzerland
 Château

References

Cultural property of national significance in the canton of Neuchâtel
Castles in the canton of Neuchâtel
Pourtalès family